Mataurá River is a river of Amazonas state in north-western Brazil. It is a tributary of the Madeira River, and merges into this river roughly halfway between the towns of Manicoré and Novo Aripuanã.

See also
List of rivers of Amazonas

References
Brazilian Ministry of Transport

Rivers of Amazonas (Brazilian state)